The Hangover Part III is a 2013 American action comedy film and the sequel to The Hangover Part II (2011), both produced by Legendary Pictures and distributed by Warner Bros. Pictures. It is the third and final installment in The Hangover trilogy. The film stars Bradley Cooper, Ed Helms, Zach Galifianakis, Ken Jeong, Jeffrey Tambor, Heather Graham, Mike Epps, Melissa McCarthy, Justin Bartha, and John Goodman with Todd Phillips directing a screenplay written by himself and Craig Mazin.

The film follows the "Wolfpack" (Phil, Stu, Doug, and Alan) as they try to get Alan the help he needs after facing a personal crisis, after the bachelor party in Bangkok. However, things go awry when an incident from the original film comes back to haunt them.

The Hangover Part III was announced days before the release of The Hangover Part II and Mazin, who co-wrote Part II, was brought on board. In January 2012, the principal actors re-signed to star. In March 2012, Warner Bros. announced a U.S. Memorial Weekend release. The supporting roles were cast between June and September 2012. Principal photography began in September 2012 in Los Angeles, California before moving to Nogales, Arizona and Las Vegas, Nevada. The film had its world premiere on May 13, 2013, in Los Angeles, California, and was released by Warner Bros. in the United States on May 23, 2013. It received negative reviews from critics and grossed $362 million worldwide.

Plot 

Two years after the events in Bangkok, Leslie Chow escapes confinement during a prison riot. Meanwhile, Alan Garner causes a multi-car freeway pileup after he purchases a giraffe and accidentally decapitates it on a low overpass. Alan's father Sid, upset about the incident and furious that Alan will not take responsibility for his actions, dies of a heart attack. At the funeral, Alan's brother-in-law Doug Billings informs Phil Wenneck and Stu Price that Alan has been off his ADHD medication and is out of control. The group attends an intervention in which Alan agrees to visit a rehabilitation facility in Arizona where he can seek treatment as long as the "Wolfpack" take him there.

Phil's minivan is rammed off the road by a rental truck and the Wolfpack is taken hostage. They are later confronted by crime lord Marshall, with "Black Doug" as his head enforcer. He tells them that a few weeks after their shenanigans in Las Vegas, Chow hijacked half of a $42 million gold heist, and, seeing how Alan has been the only one to communicate with Chow during his imprisonment, deduced that they could locate him and retrieve the gold. Marshall kidnaps Doug and gives the others three days to find Chow, or else Doug will be killed.

Alan sets up a meeting with Chow in Tijuana, where Stu and Phil will hide and attempt to drug him. However, Alan accidentally reveals their location and Chow forces them to confess they are working for Marshall. Chow explains his plan to retrieve the stolen gold from the basement of a Mexican villa he previously owned.

They break into the house and successfully retrieve the gold, but Chow double-crosses them, locking them in the basement, rearming the security system and escaping in Phil's minivan. They are arrested, but mysteriously released from the police station. They are picked up by a limousine and taken back to the villa, where they find Marshall. They learn that Chow had lied to them: the villa was in fact Marshall's the whole time and the gold they stole was the other half Chow did not get from Marshall. He spares the group for the oversight but kills "Black Doug" for his incompetence and reminds them of their now two-day deadline.

They track Phil's phone, which was left in the minivan, and find it left outside a pawn shop in Las Vegas. The owner, Cassie, tells them that Chow traded a gold brick for only $18,000, far less than its actual $400,000 value and gives them a business card for an escort service Chow is using. Using Stu's former lover Jade as their contact, they learn that Chow is barricaded in the penthouse suite of Caesars Palace. Phil and Alan sneak into his suite from the roof, but Chow escapes, jumping from the balcony and parachuting down to the Strip. Stu catches up to Chow and locks him in the trunk of Marshall's limousine. They take the gold and meet with Marshall, who releases Doug when they reveal they cannot secure the original half as Chow lost it all in Bangkok. Although Marshall had promised not to harm Chow, he shoots up the trunk of the car, presumably killing him.

However, Alan had given Chow the means to escape from the trunk through a backseat compartment just moments earlier. Chow emerges from the limo and kills Marshall and his bodyguard, but spares Phil and Stu because Alan saved his life. He offers Alan a bar of gold as a gift, but Alan turns him down and ends their friendship because of Chow's unhealthy influence on the group. As Chow sadly watches them leave, they go to retrieve Phil's minivan from the pawnshop and Alan makes a date with Cassie. Six months later, they marry and Alan resigns from the Wolfpack.

In a mid-credits scene, the Wolfpack plus Cassie appear to have staged another wild party that they can't remember. Stu now has breast implants and Alan remembers that the wedding cake was a gift from Chow. Chow emerges from the bathroom naked, carrying a katana. The chain-smoking Bangkok monkey drops from the ceiling onto Stu, startling him.

Cast 

 Bradley Cooper as Phil Wenneck
 Ed Helms as Dr. Stuart "Stu" Price
 Zach Galifianakis as Alan Garner
 Ken Jeong as Leslie Chow
 Jeffrey Tambor as Sid Garner
 Heather Graham as Jade
 Mike Epps as Black Doug

 Justin Bartha as Doug Billings

 John Goodman as Marshall

 Sasha Barrese as Tracy Billings
 Jamie Chung as Lauren Price
 Sondra Currie as Linda Garner 
 Gillian Vigman as Stephanie Wenneck

Melissa McCarthy portrays Cassie, a pawn shop worker.

Production 
In May 2011, days before the release of The Hangover Part II, director Todd Phillips said that "there already are plans for a third film but no script or start date". About the possibility of The Hangover Part III, Phillips stated, "If we were to do a third one, if the audience, if the desire was there, I think we have a very clear idea where that would head. It's certainly not in the same template that you've seen these movies. The third would be very much a finale and an ending. The most I could say about it, what's in my head, and I haven't discussed it with these actors, is that it is not following that template but very much a new idea. As far as where it takes place, I said I'm very open." Also during May, Craig Mazin, who co-wrote The Hangover Part II, entered early talks to write the script for the third installment.

In December 2011, Bradley Cooper appeared on The Graham Norton Show to promote The Hangover Part II DVD and Blu-ray release, where he stated he "hoped" that The Hangover Part III would start shooting in September 2012, and also stated that Todd Phillips was working on the script. In January 2012, it was reported that stars Bradley Cooper, Zach Galifianakis, and Ed Helms were nearing deals to reprise their roles in third installment with each receiving $15 million (against the backend) for their participation. In February 2012, Mike Tyson stated that he would return in the third film, although he later told TMZ that "I have no idea what's going on. I'm not in this one."

In March 2012, Warner Bros. announced that it was moving forward with the sequel and scheduled a release date of May 24, 2013, again aiming for a Memorial Day opening weekend. In June 2012, it was reported that the third installment would return to Las Vegas and would shoot on the Las Vegas Strip and at Caesars Palace. The report stated that much of the film would also be shot in Los Angeles and Tijuana and include a storyline that involves the boys rescuing Alan from a mental hospital.

In July 2012, Ken Jeong signed on to return in a significantly expanded role. The following week, Mike Epps entered negotiations to reprise his role of Black Doug. In August 2012, it was reported that Heather Graham would be back to play Jade the stripper. A few days later, Sasha Barrese was signed to reprise her role as Doug's wife, Tracy. In August, John Goodman began talks to join the cast in a small role, then described as an antagonist in the same vein as Paul Giamatti's character in Part II. In September 2012, Justin Bartha said he had signed on to return in the sequel.

Principal photography began on September 10, 2012, in Los Angeles. The following week, Melissa McCarthy entered negotiations to join the cast in a small role and Lela Loren was cast as a police officer. On October 8, 2012, production moved to Nogales, Arizona, which doubled as Tijuana in the film. On October 20 and 21, a stretch of California State Route 73, a toll road in Orange County was closed for filming. At the end of the month, production moved to Las Vegas for several weeks of filming. Principal photography concluded in Las Vegas on November 16, 2012.

Soundtrack 

The Hangover Part III: Original Motion Picture Soundtrack is the soundtrack of the film. It was released on May 21, 2013.
 Track listing

Other songs featured in the film, but not on the soundtrack include "Hurt" by Nine Inch Nails, "The Stranger" by Billy Joel, "N.I.B." by Black Sabbath, "Dark Fantasy" by Kanye West, "In the Air Tonight" by Phil Collins, and "Careless Whisper" by George Michael.

Release 
In early May 2013, Warner Bros. moved the release date for The Hangover Part III to Thursday, May 23, a day before Universal Pictures released Fast & Furious 6, in an attempt to beat the Memorial Day weekend rush. The Hangover Part III premiered on Monday, May 13, 2013, at the Westwood Village Theatre in Los Angeles, California.

Home media 
The Hangover Part III was released on DVD and Blu-ray, on October 8, 2013, in the US and December 2, 2013, in the UK.

Reception

Box office 
The Hangover Part III grossed $112.2 million in North America and $249.8 million in other territories for a total of $362 million, against a budget of $103 million.

The film grossed $3.1 million in late Wednesday night screenings, ahead of its wide release on Friday, May 24, 2013. It was projected to earn $80 million in its first four days. The film ended up grossing $53.5 million over its first four days, including $41.7 million in its opening weekend, far below the $135 million earned by The Hangover Part II in its opening days.

Critical response 
On Rotten Tomatoes, the film has an approval rating of 20% based on 206 reviews and an average rating of 4.2/10. The site's critical consensus reads, "Less a comedy than an angrily dark action thriller, The Hangover Part III diverges from the series' rote formula, but offers nothing compelling in its place." On Metacritic, the film has a score of 30 out of 100 based on 37 critics, indicating "generally unfavorable reviews". Audiences polled by CinemaScore gave the film an average grade of "B" on an A+ to F scale, the lowest of the trilogy.

Describing the film's negative reception, Variety speculated that the series had become critic-proof.

Andrew Barker of Variety gave the film a negative review, writing, "Ditching the hangovers, the backward structure, the fleshed-out characters and any sense of debauchery or fun, this installment instead just thrusts its long-suffering protagonists into a rote chase narrative". Barker seemed to think that it was 'debatable' whether The Hangover Part III should be considered a comedy at all, seeing as its events 'more often plays like a loopily plotted, exposition-heavy actioner.' He states: 'That the plot is convoluted and ridiculous isn’t really a problem, but by playing things completely chronologically — and worse, soberly — this film’s shenanigans feel witlessly arbitrary in a way that the previous installments avoided.'

Stephen Farber of The Hollywood Reporter wrote, "Young viewers looking for unbridled raunch will be sadly disappointed, and so will other moviegoers expecting more than a few wan chuckles." Steven Holden of The New York Times called The Hangover Part III "a dull, lazy walkthrough that along with The Big Wedding has a claim to be the year's worst star-driven movie." Betsy Sharkey of the Los Angeles Times said, "I'm not sure who let the dogs out this time, but they should be made to pay." Richard Roeper of the Chicago Sun-Times wrote, "Director Todd Phillips delivers a film so different from the first two, I'm not even sure it's supposed to be a comedy."

Christy Lemire of the Associated Press gave the film a positive review, writing, "The Hangover Part III runs a different sort of risk by going to darker and more dangerous places than its predecessors, both artistically and emotionally. It dares to alienate the very audience that made The Hangover the highest-grossing R-rated comedy of all time."

See also
 List of films set in Las Vegas

References

External links 

 
 
 
 

2013 films
2013 black comedy films
2010s buddy comedy films
2010s comedy road movies
American black comedy films
American buddy comedy films
American comedy road movies
American sequel films
Films scored by Christophe Beck
Films directed by Todd Phillips
Films produced by Todd Phillips
Films set in the Las Vegas Valley
Films set in Los Angeles
Films set in Irvine, California
Films set in Tijuana
Films shot in Arizona
Films shot in California
Films shot in the Las Vegas Valley
Films shot in Los Angeles
Films shot in Tijuana
Films with screenplays by Todd Phillips
The Hangover (film series)
Triad films
Legendary Pictures films
Warner Bros. films
2010s English-language films
2010s American films
2010s Hong Kong films
Films with screenplays by Craig Mazin